Paul Manning may refer to:

Paul Manning (journalist) (died 1995), American broadcast journalist
Paul Manning (police officer, born 1947), British police officer, Assistant Commissioner of Police of the Metropolis
Paul Manning (TV producer) (1959–2005), American television producer
Paul Manning (police officer, born 1973), British-born Canadian undercover police officer
Paul Manning (cyclist) (born 1974), British track and road racing cyclist
Paul Manning (ice hockey) (born 1979), Canadian ice hockey player
Paul Manning (cricketer), Caymanian cricketer